Reggie Boyce Clark is a former American football linebacker who played three seasons for two teams, the Pittsburgh Steelers and the Jacksonville Jaguars. He went undrafted in the 1990 NFL draft, Clark played college football for the North Carolina Tar Heels football team.

He went to high school at Providence Day School in Charlotte, North Carolina.

References

1967 births
Living people
American football linebackers
Pittsburgh Steelers players
Jacksonville Jaguars players
North Carolina Tar Heels football players
Players of American football from Charlotte, North Carolina